A double bass concerto is a notated musical composition, usually in three parts or movements (see concerto), for a solo double bass accompanied by an orchestra. Bass concertos typically require an advanced level of technique, as they often use very high-register passages, harmonics, challenging scale and arpeggio lines and difficult bowing techniques. Music students typically play bass concerti with the orchestral part played by a pianist who reads from an orchestral reduction (the orchestra parts arranged for piano).

History
The Origin of the Double Bass Concerto

Concerti originated in the Baroque era. At first, double bass concertos were very rare due to the gut strings. These strings were difficult to move with the bow and did not resonate or project as loud.

It was around 1650 that the overwound gut string was invented. This greatly increased the popularity for composers to write double bass solos.

The main eras of double bass concerts are the Classical and Romantic period. These are considered the main concerto eras until the 20th and 21st century when the Andrés Martí and Eduard Tubin concertos were written.

Early double bass concerti

The earliest bass concerto was composed by Carl von Dittersdorf in the mid 1700s. He wrote two bass concertos as well as a symphonic concerto for viola and double bass.

Other composers from the late Baroque to classical periods, such as Johannes Matthias Sperger, wrote eighteen double bass concertos. Double Bass concerti were also written by Johann Baptist Wanhal, and Joseph Haydn, although Haydn's has since been lost.

Michel Corrette changed the tuning of the double bass in 1773. Before this, double basses were tuned in thirds, known as Viennese-style tuning. This changed the way composers of the Viennese School to write virtuosic double bass solos. The appearance of Italian composer Domenico Dragonetti officially changed the status of the double bass. Dragonetti did not use the Viennese-tuned bass. 

At this point, composers of the Viennese School began to try to write new double bass works. Dragonetti was a bass virtuoso who introduced advanced new techniques for the instrument, like playing in the high register, bouncing the bow (riccochet and spiccato), and using more harmonics around the instrument.

Further Development

Giovanni Bottesini, was known as the Paganini of double bass, a nineteenth century bass virtuoso and composer. He made enormous contributions to the solo double bass repertoire. Among his many works are two concerti for double bass which use extremely high harmonic passages that, when Bottesini first introduced them, were deemed "unplayable".

Bottesini preferred the three-string double bass that was popular in Italy. In contrast to Dragonetti's preference for the older, palm-up bow, Bottesini adopted a cello-style bow, with the palm down. The Dragonetti-style bow is similar to the modern-day German bow and the Bottesini bow is the modern French bow.

This improvement had a great influence on later generations. Another indirect influence was the rise of an outstanding school of double bass players in the Czech region, represented by Franz Simandl, who devoted himself to the technique and teaching of double bass and left behind a number of works.

Around the late 20th century to present-day, Simandl has slowly been replaced by a new technique and theory of the double bass from François Rabbath. He has taken the work of Simandl and increased the technique to work around the entire fingerboard, improving modern-day double bassists’ technique even more to play old and new concertos.

The development from the 20th century to the modern age

Synthetic strings have gained a lot of popularity in the last 50 years. They have a lot of benefits, including they are vegan, have a more consistent tone, easier to play, and last longer on the bass. Some composers, of course, still prefer to find special effects on gut strings, but some companies have started making strings that sound exactly like gut strings, for example D’addario Zyex Strings.

Challenges
The double bass has not been a popular choice for a solo instrument, mainly due to the difficulties of balancing the soloist and orchestra so that the former is not overshadowed by the orchestra's volume. The low register of the double bass makes it difficult to project; to help resolve this problem, many composers (most notably Bottesini) wrote solo parts in the high register of the instrument. Another solution is to refrain from large tuttis, or employ chamberistic orchestration, when the double bass is playing in its lower register. Few major composers of the classical and romantic eras were disposed to writing double bass concerti, as there were few instrumentalists capable of taking on the demands of playing as a soloist; it was only through the efforts of virtuosos like Dragonetti, Bottesini, Koussevitsky, and Karr that the double bass began to be recognized as a solo instrument. As the twentieth century began, the standard of double bass technique improved by a significant degree, making it a more popular choice for composers.

Double basses have changed since the 18th century, when the concerti by Vanhal, Dittersdorf, and Pichl were written. One difference concerns the fingerboard; bassists would tie old strings or cloth to make frets on their instrument, much like a viola da gamba. This is in contrast to the present day, where the bassist is in charge of tuning purely based on their left hand finger placement due to a lack of frets. Another factor that makes playing Classical-era concerti more difficult on a modern instrument is the tuning. Many concerti from the late 18th century from the Vienna region were intended for a bass tuned (low to high) D1/F1-A1-D2-F♯2-A2 for a five-string bass. Four-string basses would omit the lowest string. This tuning used a D major arpeggio for the top four strings (or all the strings on a four-string bass), and this is the reason many concerti from this period are in that key. Some concerti are, however, in E♭, E, or even F major. In these situations, the bassist would tune the strings as needed, raising the pitch by as much as a minor third, possible due to the lower-tension gut strings from that period. The result was better balance: the other string instruments would have a duller, less resonant sound in E♭ major, while the bassist, reading a transposed part in D major, would have a more resonant tuning and the bass would project better. Certain passages from that time included fast arpeggios, which were relatively easy to execute with Viennese tuning. However, now that basses are tuned in fourths, (low to high) E1-A1-D2-G2, many of these Classical-era concerti are difficult to play. Dittersdorf's Concerto No. 2 (pictured at right) is an example of this. That passage could be played with a bass in Viennese tuning using only open strings and harmonics. In standard tuning, it is much harder to play, and can be executed in several different ways, each way having major challenges for either the left or right hand.

Haydn's Lost Double Bass Concerto 
The only surviving parts of Haydn’s missing double bass concerto are the first two measures. It is assumed that this concerto dates back around 1763, around 2 years after Haydn was hired as a full-time composer for the Prince’s Orchestra. Haydn wrote it specifically for the second bassoonist that also played double bass in the orchestra, Johann Georg Schwenda. Typical to the time, this concerto was written in D major, for Viennese-tuned double basses. Sam Suggs, a double bassist and composer, took the first two measures Haydn wrote and completed the rest of the piece in the style of Haydn. He calls it Haydn [Re]Creation: Reviving the Lost Concerto. He took the small melody Haydn wrote and made different permutations throughout the three movements. Suggs has not yet published this work, but performed it at the International Society of Bassists Convention in 2019 in Bloomington, Indiana.

Selected list 

 Carl Ditters von Dittersdorf (1739-1799)
 Concerto in E♭ major
 Concerto No. 2 in E Major
 Johannes Matthias Sperger (1750~1812)
 Double Bass Concerto No. 2 in E-flat major
 Double Bass Concerto No. 3 in B-flat major
 Double Bass Concerto No. 4 in F major
 Double Bass Concerto No. 5 in E-flat major
 Double Bass Concerto No. 7 in A major
 Double Bass Concerto No. 8 in E-flat major
 Double Bass Concerto No. 9 in E-flat major
 Double Bass Concerto No. 10 in E-flat major
 Double Bass Concerto No. 11 in B-flat major
 Double Bass Concerto No. 15 in D major
 Double Bass Concerto No. 17 in B-flat major
 Double Bass Concerto No. 18 in C minor
 Franz Anton Hoffmeister 1754-1812
 Concerto No. 1 in D major
 Concerto No. 2 in D major
 Concerto No. 3 in D major
 Antonio Capuzzi
 Concerto in D (F) major
 Domenico Dragonetti 
 Concerto in G major, D. 290
 Concerto in D dur
 Concerto in A major No. 3
 Concerto in A major No. 5
 Concerto in A major (Nanny)
 Giovanni Bottesini (1821–1889)
 Gran Concerto in F♯ minor
 Concerto No. 2 in B minor
 Concerto No. 3 in A major (concerto di bravura)
 Serge Koussevitsky 
 Concerto in F♯ minor, Op. 3 (1902)
 Mauricio Annunziata
 Concerto No. 1 for Double Bass and Orchestra "Argentino", Op. 123
 Concerto No. 2 for Double Bass and Orchestra "Afroargentino", Op. 125
 Concerto No. 3 for Double Bass and Orchestra "Porteño", Op. 129
 Concerto No. 4 for Double Bass and Orchestra "Popular", Op. 135
 Concerto No. 5 for Double Bass and Orchestra "Andino", Op. 141
 Sinfonia Concerto for Double Bass, Piano and Orchestra, Op. 137
 Georgi Conus 
 Concerto in h moll, Op. 29 (1910)
 Edouard Nanny 
 Concerto in E minor
 Nikos Skalkottas 
 Double Bass Concerto (1942)
 Eduard Tubin 
 Double Bass Concerto (1948)
 Stefan Boleslaw Poradowski 
 Double Bass Concerto (1929)
 Andrzej Cwojdziński 
 Concerto (1959)
 Serge Lancen 
 Concerto pur contrebasse et cordes
 Anatoly Bogatyrev
 Double bass concerto (1964)
 Aldemaro Romero
 Concierto risueño (2006)
 Hans Werner Henze 
 Double Bass Concerto (1966)
 Virgilio Mortari 
 Concerto per Franco Petracchi
 Nino Rota 
 Divertimento Concertante for double bass and orchestra (1968–1973)
 Johann Baptist Vanhal
 Concerto in E♭ major (pub. 1969)
 Gordon Jacob 
 Concerto for Double Bass (1972)
 Friedrich Schenker
 Double Bass Concerto (1973)
 Jean Françaix 
 Concerto for double bass and orchestra (1974)
 Einojuhani Rautavaara 
 Angel of Dusk, concerto for double bass and orchestra (1980)
 Wilfred Josephs
 Double Bass Concerto Op. 118 (1980)
 Jiří Hudec 
 Burleska for double bass and orchestra (1981)
 Juliusz Łuciuk 
 Concerto for Double Bass and Orchestra (1986)
 Kurt Schwertsik
 Double Bass Concerto Op. 56 (1989)
 Gennady Lyashenko 
 Concerto for Double bass and chamber orchestra (1989)
 Peter Maxwell Davies 
 Strathclyde Concerto No. 7 for Double Bass and Orchestra (1992)
 Harald Genzmer 
 Concerto for Kontrabass and String Orchestra (1996)
 Raymond Luedeke 
 Concerto for Double Bass and Orchestra (1997)
 Ståle Kleiberg
 Double bass Concerto (1999) 
 Edgar Meyer 
 Concerto in D for Double Bass and Orchestra (2002)
 Robin Holloway 
 Concerto for Double Bass and Small Orchestra Op. 83 (2002)
 Kalevi Aho
 Double Bass Concerto (2005)
 Anthony Ritchie 
 Whalesong (2006)
 Katarzyna Brochocka
 Double Bass concerto (2007)
 Dai Fujikura
 Double Bass Concerto (2010)
 Rolf Martinsson 
 Double Bass Concerto
 Andrés Martín
 Double Bass concerto (2012)
 Edward Kravchuk 
 Concerto for Double Bass, Drum set, Piano and Strings (2014)
 Thomas Goss
 Double Bass Concerto in E Minor
 Behzad Ranjbaran 
 Concerto for Double Bass and Orchestra (2018)
 Arda Ardaşes Agoşyan
 Concerto for Double Bass and a cappella choir (Romeo and Juliet) 
 Pere Valls i Duran 
 Gran Concert Obligat
 Fredrik Högberg 
 "Hitting the First Base" Concerto for Double Bass and Strings
 Wenzel Pichl 
 Concerto in D major
 Missy Mazzoli
 Dark with Excessive Bright (2018)

References 

Concertos